Solon Michaelides (12 November 190510 September 1979) was a Cypriot composer, teacher and musicologist. He taught himself the guitar as a schoolkid. He was appointed guitar teacher in the Cypriot Conservatory, where he learned piano. He studied in the UK and France. After his studies he spend the next two decades in Limassol. He created a choir that survives today as Aris choir, with which he presented opera (Dido and Aeneas) and oratorio classics as well as choral works. He was a music teacher at Lanitio school. He moved to Salonika in the 1950s, where he continued teaching and created a symphony orchestra that was nationalised in the 1960s and is still active today. He wrote extensively, including books on the harmony of modern music, Cypriot music, modern Greek music and his Encyclopaedia of Ancient Greek Music. He composed several works for choir, orchestra and solo such as the archaic suite, Eleftheria etc. His archive was left to the municipality of Limassol where he spent his most creative years. There is a dedicated museum-archive building housing the archive next to the municipal conservatoire. Works by Michaelides have been recorded by Greek symphony orchestras. There is also a dedicated cd which is a live recording his works in concert with a combined choir of members of Aris and Foni tis Kerynias choirs, and the Cyprus symphony orchestra

External links
http://www.limassolmunicipal.com.cy/archives/index_en.html
http://www.kyreniachoir.com.cy/

1905 births
1979 deaths
20th-century classical composers
20th-century Greek people
20th-century classical pianists
Cypriot classical pianists
Cypriot composers
Male composers
Greek classical composers
Greek classical guitarists
Greek classical pianists
Male classical composers
20th-century guitarists
Male classical pianists
20th-century male musicians